Yogyakarta International Airport  is an international airport located at Temon district of Kulon Progo Regency, in Java, Indonesia. The airport is situated around 45 kilometers from the city of Yogyakarta, which serves the Yogyakarta Special Region, as well as nearby Central Javan cities such as Purworejo, Kebumen, Cilacap and Magelang. It is the largest and one of the three airports in the Yogyakarta Special Region, the other being Adisutjipto Airport which is located closer to the Yogyakarta city center and Gading Airfield in Wonosari, Gunung Kidul Regency. The airport serves flights to and from several cities and towns in Indonesia and some international destinations such as Malaysia and Singapore.

The airport is operated by Angkasa Pura I. The airport replaced Adisutjipto Airport of Yogyakarta. The airport commenced operations on 6 May 2019 with the first arrival, a Citilink flight from Jakarta's Halim Perdanakusuma International Airport. The airport became fully operational on 29 March 2020 with all scheduled flights (except turboprops, cargo and other non-commercial flights) relocated from the old airport.

Facilities and infrastructure

The new airport is anticipated to accommodate twenty million passengers annually upon completion. The airport is equipped with an early detection system for earthquakes, tsunamis and extreme weather events. It can withstand an earthquake with a magnitude of up to 8.8 on the Richter scale and a 12-m-high tidal wave.

The airport will be developed in two phases. In the first phase of development, the airport will have a terminal area of 130,000 square meters with a capacity of up to 15 million passengers per year. The total land area of the airport is about 645 hectares. The airport runway has dimensions of 3,250 x 45 meters and can serve even wide-body aircraft such as the Boeing 777 and the Airbus A380. In the second phase of development, the new airport terminal will be developed to 195,000 square meters that can accommodate up to 20 million passengers per year. The length of the runway will be extended by 350 meters to 3,600 x 45 meters wide with an apron where up to 45 aircraft can be parked.

Future 
Plans also include turning the airport land into an airport city integrated with industrial and tourism areas. The airport is designed to be resistant to earthquakes measuring up to 8.8 on the Richter magnitude scale as it was constructed in an earthquake-prone area, and will be equipped with tsunami mitigation facilities. At present part of the terminal, about 129,000-square-meter is completed and used. When completed the terminal will spread over 210,000 sqm. There will be three islands of check-in counters, with 32 counters in each of the islands. Parts of the airport feature local traditional artwork and local wisdoms, represented by the Jasmine flower and Wijayakusuma (Epiphyllum oxypetalum), designed by local artists.

One of the plans for the airport is the construction of flood mitigation facilities as the airport is experiencing flood risks. The flood mitigation efforts will include normalization of river, increasing the flow capacity of the river, construction of pump houses, retention pools, and drainage systems. The flood mitigation facilities are planned to be finished in 2023.

Airlines and destinations

Passenger

Controversy
40% of the land that will be used for the airport is classified as "Paku Alam Ground" while the rest belongs to local communities. The location is in Temon District between Congot Beach and Glagah Beach (which covers Palihan village, Sindutan village, Jangkaran village and Glagah village).

Affected residents learnt about the construction of YIA in 2011. Dissemination of YIA development was carried out by the Regional Government and related Offices, PT Angkasa Pura I, and the National Land Agency (BPN) of Kulon Progo Regency in 2014. The rejection by the affected people was covered by the mass media. The reason people rejected the planned YIA was the construction of the airport would eliminate the land that is the source of their livelihood as farmers. They also claimed about environmental issues with the proposed site as well as issues of safety, due to the area being at high risk for tsunamis and other natural disasters. In addition there are a few historic as well as scared places for local community with the airport development area. The rejection of the YIA development has begun since the establishment of the Wahana Tri Tunggal (WTT). Later some of its members formed the Community Association for Refusing Kulonprogo Evictions (PWPP-KP). Initially, the attitude of refusing unconditionally became the principle of the WTT towards the construction of the YIA, until finally they accepted the construction provided that there was a reassessment of the assets of buildings, plants and other supporting facilities. Meanwhile, from the formation of the PWPP-KP until now, the attitude of refusing unconditionally still continues. As of July 2018, there are 86 families who still refused to sell their land for the airport's development.

On November 28, 2017, the Chairperson of the Ombudsman of the Republic of Indonesia requested a delay in emptying residents land because they were conducting an investigation regarding the possibility of maladministration in the process. The National Commission on Human Rights said that the handling of citizens in the YIA conflict area is relatively good compared to conflicts in many other areas with more complex levels of conflict. At the same time, the commission considers there are human rights violations that occurred and need not be done in emptying the land occupied by residents.

Ground transportation
At present DAMRI shuttle buses serve routes from YIA to Adisucipto International Airport, Wojo Station, Purworejo, Kebumen and Magelang. Another bus service Satelqu serves routes from YIA to Adisutjipto International Airport, Cilacap and Purwokerto.

The airport is planned to be connected to Yogyakarta city center via toll road. A planned toll road would link YIA with another planned toll roads, Yogyakarta-Solo Toll Road and Yogyakarta-Bawen Toll Road, as the complementary parts to the existing Semarang-Solo Toll Road of Trans-Java Toll Road network.

YIA is served via rail by Yogyakarta International Airport Rail Link. Since 17 September 2021, the new railway station inside the airport is opened for regular service which enables direct travel between downtown Yogyakarta and the airport by train.

There is provisions for the operation of Damri shuttle buses, SatelQu, airport taxis, online taxis, and trains via Wojo station to connect the airport with Borobudur.

Gallery

See also

Adisutjipto International Airport
Kulon Progo Regency

References

External links

 Yogyakarta International Airport

Kulon Progo Regency
Airports in the Special Region of Yogyakarta